Walter Dyer (died ), of Wells, Somerset, was an English politician.

He was a Member (MP) of the Parliament of England for Wells in October 1404 and 1406.

References

14th-century births
1420s deaths
English MPs October 1404
Politicians from Somerset
English MPs 1406